Ronald Masters (20 April 1913 – 6 March 1972) was an Australian diver who competed in the 1936 Summer Olympics.

In 1936 he finished 14th in the 3 metre springboard event and 15th in the 10 metre platform competition. At the 1938 Empire Games he won the gold medal in the high diving contest and the silver medal in the 3 metre springboard event.

References

External links
 

1913 births
1972 deaths
Olympic divers of Australia
Divers at the 1936 Summer Olympics
Divers at the 1938 British Empire Games
Commonwealth Games gold medallists for Australia
Commonwealth Games silver medallists for Australia
Australian male divers
Commonwealth Games medallists in diving
20th-century Australian people
Medallists at the 1938 British Empire Games